The Art of Julian Lloyd Webber is a 2011 album by Julian Lloyd Webber.

Track listing
Disc 1
 "Cello Concerto 1st Movement" by Edward Elgar
 "The Swan" by Saint-Saëns
 "Salut d'amour" by Edward Elgar
 "Clair de Lune" by Claude Debussy
 "Meditation from Thais" by Jules Massenet
 "Jesu, Joy of Man's Desiring" by Bach
 "Air on the G string" by Bach
 "Pie Jesu" by Andrew Lloyd Webber
 "Allegro Appassionato" by Saint-Saëns
 "Songs My Mother Taught Me" by Antonín Dvořák
 "Song of the Black Swan" by Heitor Villa-Lobos
 "Nocturne" by Alexander Borodin
 "To Spring" by Grieg
 "Ave Maria" by Giulio Caccini
 "Chanson de Matin" by Edward Elgar
 "Romanza for cello and orchestra" by Ralph Vaughan Williams
 "Siciliana" by Bach
 "Duo (with Secret Garden)" by Rolf Lovland
 "The Girl from Ipanema" by Antonio Carlos Jobim

Disc 2
 "Arioso for 2 cellos and strings" by Gian Carlo Menotti
 "Music of the Night" by Andrew Lloyd Webber
 "Nocturne" by Tchaikovsky
 "Adagio" by Albinoni
 "Ave Maria" by Bach
 "Panis Angelicus" by Franck
 "Elegie" by Fauré
 "Nocturne" by Taube
 "Adagio in G" by Bach
 "Brigg Fair" by Grainger
 "Reverie" by Claude Debussy
 "Slow Movement from Cello Concerto in B flat" by Boccherini
 "Mary's Lullaby" by John Rutter
 "Song for Baba" by Julian Lloyd Webber
 "Cradle Song" by Brahms
 "Kol Nidrei" by Bruch
 "Flight of the Bumble Bee" by Rimsky-Korsakov
 "Theme from the South Bank Show" by Andrew Lloyd Webber

Recording
The recording of Gian Carlo Menotti's Arioso is a world premiere in this version.

Artists Involved
 Julian Lloyd Webber, Cello
 Jiaxin Cheng, Cello
 Royal Philharmonic Orchestra
 London Symphony Orchestra
 Academy of St. Martin in the Fields
 English Chamber Orchestra
 Yehudi Menuhin
 Neville Marriner
 Maxim Shostakovich
 Yan Pascal Tortelier

External links 

 The Art of Julian Lloyd Webber album reviews
 
 Royal Philharmonic Orchestra
 The English Chamber Orchestra
 Julian Lloyd Webber

2011 classical albums
Julian Lloyd Webber albums